Snodgrassia buruana is a species of moth of the family Tortricidae. It is found on the Maluku Islands of Indonesia, where it has been recorded from the island of Buru.

References

	

Moths described in 1941
Archipini